Platani is a village in the municipal unit of Rio, Achaea, Greece. In 2011, it had a population of 481. It is situated in the northern foothills of the Panachaiko mountain. It is 4 km east of Rio, and 2 km south of Agios Vasileios.

Population

See also

List of settlements in Achaea

External links
Platani at the GTP Travel Pages

References

Rio, Greece
Populated places in Achaea